John Smith Jackson Maconnachie (8 May 1885 – 1956) was a Scottish professional football player and manager.

Career
Born in Aberdeen, Maconnachie spent his early career in his native Scotland with Glasgow Perthshire and Hibernian, before moving to English side Everton in 1907. Between September 1907 and May 1915 Maconnachie made 229 appearances in the English Football League, winning the competition as team captain in 1914–15 before the regular competitions were suspended during World War I, during which he served in the British Army, then as a mechanic in the Royal Air Force. He resumed his football career when the conflict was over and played one further top level season for Everton (16 league appearances, 2 goals) in 1919–20.

Maconnachie then moved to Swindon Town, making a further 55 appearances in the Football League Third Division (South) over two seasons. He moved to Sweden in 1922 to become manager of Djurgårdens IF, a club he had played for as a guest during the war, and then on loan, but soon returned to England, making one more appearance for Swindon in January 1923. He later managed Barrow between 1927 and 1928; now well into his 40s, he played twice for them in February 1928.

References

1885 births
Footballers from Aberdeen
1956 deaths
Scottish footballers
Scottish football managers
Scottish expatriate football managers
Glasgow Perthshire F.C. players
Hibernian F.C. players
Everton F.C. players
Djurgårdens IF Fotboll players
Shelbourne F.C. players
Swindon Town F.C. players
Scottish Football League players
English Football League players
Djurgårdens IF Fotboll managers
Barrow A.F.C. managers
Association football defenders
British Army personnel of World War I
Royal Air Force personnel of World War I
Scottish Junior Football Association players
Scottish expatriate sportspeople in Sweden
Expatriate football managers in Sweden
Expatriate footballers in Sweden